Neodymium chloride may refer to:

 Neodymium(II) chloride (neodymium dichloride), NdCl2
 Neodymium(III) chloride (neodymium trichloride), NdCl3